Otto Schrader may refer to:

 Otto Schrader (philologist) (1855–1919), German philologist and Indo-European scholar
 Otto von Schrader (1888–1945), German naval officer